Slobozia-Dușca is a village in Criuleni District, Moldova.
The river Dniester flows near the village.

Notable people
 Ion Luchianov
 Claudia Sersun

References

Villages of Criuleni District
Populated places on the Dniester